Kennet Valley Alderwoods is a  biological Site of Special Scientific Interest west of Newbury in Berkshire. It is a Special Area of Conservation

The SSSI includes two woods, the Wilderness and part of Ryott's Plantation, which are important because they support a very great diversity of plants associated with this woodland type, dominated by Alder (Alnus glutinosa), though Ash (Fraxinus excelsior) is abundant in places and there is occasional Oak (Quercus robur) and Wych Elm (Ulmus glabra). In addition to the wide range of higher plants the woods support a diverse bryophyte flora including the uncommon epiphytes Radula complanata, Zygodon viridissimus and Orthotrichum affine.

The site is private land with no public access.

References

Sites of Special Scientific Interest in Berkshire
Geological Conservation Review sites
Forests and woodlands of Berkshire
Sites of Special Scientific Interest notified in 1997
Special Areas of Conservation in England
Welford, Berkshire